This is a list of fictional characters appearing in the Cyborg 009 manga by Shotaro Ishinomori and its adaptations.

Protagonists

00 Cyborgs
  - Cyborg 009,  and the main character/leader 
He is super-humanly strong, resistant to damage, can leap large distances, and can breathe underwater. His most prominent ability is the power to move at a speed so fast that everything else looks like a statue to him, this is triggered by a switch embedded in his teeth. Shimamura is unable to touch any living creatures, such as humans, when he's in this state, as the high speeds would kill or otherwise seriously maim the creature through air friction. During each of the series, he acts as the field leader and first line attack of the 00 Cyborgs.

Joe is originally from Japan, although he is actually half-Japanese whose unknown father was presumably a soldier in the US Army stationed in Japan after World War II. A delinquent youth who was shunned by his peers because he was a half-breed, he escaped from a juvenile detention facility before being captured by Black Ghost. In the 2001 anime, after his father disappeared and his mother died on the steps at his childbirth, he was an orphan taken in by a Catholic priest from Kanazawa along with their street friends, Mary Onodera (perhaps a tribute to Shotaro Ishinomori, his birth name being Shotaro Onodera), Shin'ichi Ibaraki, and Masaru Oyamada. When he turned 18, his mentor was killed by Black Ghost members after they used a group of children that he raised in the church as guinea pigs for the Cyborg project; Joe was wrongfully blamed, then captured by the priest's killers and made into a cyborg. In the 1960 and 1980 film versions, Joe was a famous racer, nicknamed "Hurricane Joe", who gets into a crash and is recovered by Black Ghost (similar to 004's origin), who then adds several body enhancements during the process of being turned into a cyborg.

 - Cyborg 001 
Originally from Russia, Ivan was born with a severe illness which his father Gamo, a famous brain surgeon, tried to cure but went mad trying to do so. Gamo performed numerous brain enhancement processes on Ivan in his attempt to cure him which granted the young child a mental capacity far exceeding that of a normal human. However, the implants were inserted against the wishes of Ivan's mother, Erika (whom Gamo killed in the manga). Ivan's enhanced brain gives him several psychic powers, including, telepathy, telekinesis, and extrasensory perception. However, due to the incredible amount of energy the infant expends with every psychic function, it is necessary for him to sleep as long as several days at a time in order to return to functionality.  

Ivan would later fall into the custody of Black Ghost, who dubbed him the first member of the organization's 00-Cyborg program. He was one of the 00 Cyborgs who were frozen until more advanced technology and procedures were developed. While still a pacifier-sucking infant, he is talented in scientific analysis and can telepathically converse at an adult level. He acts as the 00 Cyborgs central command and emergency psychokinetic defense.

 - Cyborg 002 
Unmistakable with his swept-back hair, confident smile and longer-than-real-life nose, Jet has thrusters built into his feet, allowing him to fly at speeds of up to Mach 5. Jet is also equipped with an earlier, less powerful acceleration mode, later refined in 009.

In the 2001 anime continuity, Jet was originally 001, but was replaced by Ivan. Jet comes from New York City in the United States and was the leader of a street gang on Manhattan's West Side.  His character is introduced in both the manga and the anime holding his own in a fight with a rival gang; when the police appeared he was aided by nearby Black Ghost members who offered to take him away from the scene. Rendered unconscious, he was eventually brought to the organization's scientific headquarters to be unwillingly made into a cyborg. He has a brash personality which often conflicts with his peers, but he's a loyal, good-hearted member of the team. He provides air support and rescue.

 - Cyborg 003 
She has enhanced vision and hearing, allowing her to see through walls and sense objects an enormous distance away; and is also an excellent pilot, technician, and a machine whiz.

Françoise was originally a ballet dancer from France. Her brother Jean (Jean-Paul in the English dub), a member of the French Air Force returning to Paris on a one-week leave, was to meet Françoise at the train station. However, she was kidnapped by Black Ghost operatives, despite repeated attempts by her brother to save her along the way. In the third anime series, Black Ghost offers a fake professional dancing career so they can kidnap her. She is the only female member of the team, 003 rarely fights though she will when needed and she's often seen either directing the battle under Gilmore's guidance or caring for 001. In the 2001 anime, she was one of the 00 Cyborgs who were frozen until more advanced technology and procedures were developed; she's chronologically in her 50s, being 19 when captured. Her jobs include reconnaissance, advance warning, and caring for 001. She and Joe seem to have a romantic relationship.

 - Cyborg 004  
Albert was originally from Germany (specifically, East Berlin). He and his fiancée, Hilda attempted to escape to West Berlin in the guise of circus performers. When Albert forgot to retrieve his forged identification from a guard, he panicked and sped off. The border guards opened fire on the truck, injuring Albert and killing Hilda in the process. Black Ghost agents arrived on the scene and lied to Albert, telling him they'd take him to a hospital.

004 often has a gruff exterior which belies his friendly personality and disgust with war, and he is also a skilled combat tactician. He was the last of the 00 Cyborgs who were then frozen until more advanced technology and procedures were made and is chronologically the oldest of the group, being already 30 years old when captured. The extent of his injuries also resulted in him receiving the most extensive cyborg modifications: the fingertips on his right hand conceal machine gun barrels, his left hand has razor-sharp edges, and he has missiles hidden in his knees. In the 2001 series, upon waking up as a cyborg, Albert was stricken with despair and developed suicidal tendencies, aggravated by the side effects of his modifications which caused him additional physical pain and strain. This ultimately forced Black Ghost to halt the cyborg program for decades, and put the existing cyborgs in suspended animation until technology developed sufficiently to make future cyborg soldiers more stable. He is most often frontline advance and anti-personnel.

 - Cyborg 005 
Also called "G-Junior" for short, he was originally from an undisclosed part of the southwest United States (either Arizona or New Mexico). G-Junior is a Native American who was unable to find work because of widespread racism. He was approached to be a Native American chief in a sideshow, but G-Junior simply punched the sideshow owner in the face, refusing to further the stereotypes about his culture. Black Ghost agents overheard the conversation and offered G-Junior a job far from home. G-Junior accepted, admitting that he really had no home anymore (In the 2001 series he was a freelance construction worker bribed into accepting a very promising job offer by disguised Black Ghost agents). Geronimo was the first created when Black Ghost resumed its cyborg soldier program. His principal job is line defense and artillery, typically using boulders as missiles against aggressors.

Physically, he is the strongest as well as the biggest of the 00 Cyborgs; he also has heavily armored skin. He is a quiet, reserved man with a deep reverence for nature and life, and it's speculated that he may have a sort of sixth sense that allows him to sense changes in the nature and possibly other people's thoughts.

 - Cyborg 006 
Chang was originally from China. He was an impoverished Chinese farmer who once owned a pig farm; almost all of his pigs ran away and he was starving and suffering under heavy taxes. Hopeless, Chang decided to end his misery by hanging himself, but was "saved" by a bullet from Black Ghost which cut the noose. Chang fainted and was later delivered to the Black Ghost laboratory (In the 2001 series, he owned a restaurant, thus explaining why he's such a good cook, but accidentally burned it down after doing a fire-breathing trick, which resulted in him losing everything. Black Ghost agents then abducted him after he fainted from the shock). He's a jovial fellow who is well-versed in the ways of cooking; his refined cuisine and happy personality always manage to bring his teammates back to good spirits. His role, aside from food preparation, is anti-personnel and line advance.

Chang's power allows him to breathe huge flames which he uses to create tunnels in the earth and attack enemies with underground explosions.

 - Cyborg 007  
007 has the incredible ability to reshape his cellular structure at will, allowing him to take the form of any object, creature, or person he wishes. With his superb acting skills, he can also blend in with the enemy to use sneaky maneuvers and attacks. His powers make 007 a master of infiltration/espionage; by morphing into a dangerous animal or gigantic form he can also be very useful in field combat.

Great Britain, whose real name is unknown, was originally from the United Kingdom. He was once a famous and talented stage actor with a broad knowledge of famous shows but a weakness for Alcohol caused his downfall. In the 2001 TV series, Great Britain was in love with an actress named Sophie, who worked with him. Later he became more famous and gradually ignored his past love. One financial problem after another arose, and the once great thespian was reduced over time to a penniless nobody who would do anything for a drink or a smoke. Black Ghost agents, noticing his plight, easily lured Great Britain into their vehicle with an alcoholic beverage. Later when he escapes with the other cyborgs he returns to the United Kingdom and finds out that his ex-girlfriend had a daughter, Rosa. With the possibility that she might be his child, Great Britain tries to talk to her but is unfortunately rejected and scorned for his past actions (Rosa believed him to have betrayed Sophie), to be redeemed only in the end when he replaces a main actor in Rosa's theatrical play and manages to befriend her. Great Britain is very lighthearted and is a very amiable guy to boot. Giving credence to his personality as a comic relief, there is a running gag where Great Britain often takes the form of a precocious, almost super deformed, spoiled child fearing for his own life.

In the 1960s anime versions, he is a child rather than an adult, in an attempt by the producers to appeal to a younger audience. Though Ishinomori initially disapproved of this, he later temporarily mirrored it in the manga version by having Gilmore alter 007's body to make the child form his standard form in a one-shot titled "The Man in the High Castle" (though this change was quickly discarded soon after).

 - Cyborg 008 
Pyunma, the only member of the team with real combat training, has mechanical lungs that allow him to survive for very long periods of time underwater.

Pyunma was originally from an undisclosed part of Africa (eventually revealed to be Kenya in 1992). Originally, Pyunma was to have been made a slave along with the people of his tribe, but he escaped from his chains and ran off. Cornered by the slave drivers, all seemed lost until the slave drivers were shot dead by Black Ghost agents from out of nowhere. Holding Pyunma at gunpoint, they led him to their plane so he could be taken to the cybernetics laboratory. In the 2001 series, Pyunma was a guerilla fighter who fought against the tyrant ruling his land along with his friends Kabore and Mamado, but was caught in the crossfire during a nocturnal fight, and then Black Ghost people kidnapped him. Pyunma is a serious fighter and decision-maker when the situation demands it. His talents include guerrilla-style land maneuvers plus undersea recon and demolition. Near the end of the 2001 series, he is given an unwanted rebuild that leaves him with a silver-scaled fishlike body; he is initially horrified by it, but after a talk with 004 he accepts it and even gives his new parts an effective and ingenious use in a fight. In the original 1960s and 1970's incarnations, Pyuma's body design was inspired in the darky iconography of older American cartoons. This is in contrast to the seriousness of the character's no-nonsense, battle-trained personality. In the 80s movie Chou Ginga Densetsu, Pyunma was redesigned as less caricatured and more naturalistic; this same revamped design was updated for the 2001 series.

Humans
 
The lead scientist in the 00 Cyborg program, Gilmore was a dutiful worker who hid a deep distrust for Black Ghost's plans. (In the 2001 series, he only begins to have serious misgivings about the time 005 is built - his superiors force him to install a lower-grade part, because it would lead to more revenue - and has a much less prominent role in creating the rest.) After the cybernetic enhancements for the first nine 00 Cyborgs were complete, he intentionally let himself be "taken hostage" by the cyborgs. Since then, he has been the team's advisor and father figure, not only helping to formulate the team's plans but also assisting them with the nuances of their newfound mechanical bodies.

In the 1979 series it is revealed that he and fellow scientist Reinhardt was captured and forced to work on Operation Superman (possibly the first cyborg project ever) for the Nazi regime during the 1940s. Gilmore, when he learned that he was working on Hitler's secret project, was disgusted by this fact and decided to escape. He was aided by the chaos created by an Allied strike on the laboratory he was working in and managed to escape in the confusion.

 
Calm and perceptive Kozumi is Gilmore's old friend from before he joined Black Ghost, and is also a doctor specialized in biochemistry (it's hinted he may be even on the Nobel Prize level). His mansion in the outskirts of Tokyo became the cyborg's HQ during the first episodes; Kozumi not only helped develop the antidote for a poison that affected the cyborgs, but also aided 004 when he was starting to doubt himself again, and was the first person to notice how Gilmore and the cyborgs were becoming more of a family than merely a group of fighters. He was kidnapped by Black Ghost, and the cyborgs had to rescue him by fighting and defeating 0012 and 0013; after that, he remained a good friend of the team.

Voice casts

Antagonists

Skull/Black Ghost
 - called Black Ghost in certain versions, is the tyrannical leader of an evil organization called the Black Ghost Organization (its main mission is to cause war between two global powers by dealing weapons). His true identity is not known because he wears a helmet, which looks like a skull, and an all-black suit (with a design that makes it appear to have what looks like ribs) followed by a red cape. His given name is, according to some sources, Skull. A possible origin for him exists in the 2007 anime adaptation of The Skull Man in which main character Hayato is revived and takes up an appearance almost exactly like that of Skull.

Skull was almost killed when the 00 cyborgs entered Black Ghost's Base (what they thought was Black Ghost HQ until later in the manga and anime) and set explosives leaving 009 and Skull to fight one-on-one. It is revealed that Skull is not only a cyborg, but a highly advanced cyborg, soundly defeating 009 using his superior acceleration mode. Only a last-ditch effort managed to save the nine cyborgs (009 held on to Black Ghost whilst plummeting into what looked like a vat of liquid nitrate and then 001 teleported 009 to safety).

It is not known how Skull survived the explosion. In addition to Skull apparently being a cyborg himself, the true leaders of the Black Ghost Organization turn out to be three brains. Although the 3 brains were destroyed in the end, they claim to be only one "cell" of the Black Ghost organization and that Black Ghost will exist as long there's evil in men's heart.

00 Cyborg Assassins
Cyborg 0010 +/- ~ Twin brothers transformed into cyborgs. They are the first assassin cyborgs sent after the heroes. They can accelerate like 009 using the switch in their teeth and with the help of their eyes can fire thunderbolts. Their weakness lies in their opposite polarities: one brother being positive (0010+), the other negative (0010-): should they come into contact, they would annihilate each other. It's this which leads to their eventual downfall, an event caused by 001 and 009. Their ability to channel electricity shorts out if they are doused in water; they may still use their electrical attacks as long as they work in tandem and one remains dry.
Cyborg 0011 - A giant, black, mechanical spider-like cyborg. He was a normal man whose mind was put into this machine and his only wish is to return to his own body so he may see his wife and daughter; he is willing to do anything, even kill, to get such a goal. After learning this, 004 tries to convince him to change sides and almost succeeds, but after 0011 falls into the sea he returns, his mind now being controlled by Black Ghost, totally bent on destruction. He fires lasers and sticky goop from holes in his sides which can be covered and he can release a toxic rain cloud that poisons even cyborgs. He is defeated by 004, who manages to shoot him in his weak spot reluctantly; he had hoped to reason with 0011 first, but wasn't heard.
Cyborg 0012 - A beautiful woman who is actually a cyborg mansion. She was a rich, noble-born foreigner lady who only lived (and eventually died) waiting for her husband, who died in World War I; eventually Black Ghost converted her abandoned mansion into a cyborg deathtrap, with her mind locked inside her cryogenically-frozen body as the main control. She controls everything in the house and can use holograms with her original looks to communicate with her victims. 007 is at first smitten with her and even after learning she is a killer cyborg, still holds sympathy for her and tries to help her, only to be shunned. She is defeated by 004, 007, and 009.
Cyborg 0013 - A kind-hearted cyborg in the shape of a pudgy boy in his mid-to-late teens. Even though he works for Black Ghost, he kills many of the assassins who are supposed to assist him, refuses to kill an old friend of Dr. Gilmore who has been taken hostage, and even helps 009 to save a little girl caught in the crossfire. He can project his thoughts and like 009 can accelerate using a switch, but to a level where it appears there is more than one of him. He is also telepathically connected to a giant robot which can become invisible. After he is defeated by 009, 0013 decides to kill himself by destroying the robot, believing that was the only way to escape from Black Ghost's control. Before he dies, he asks what 009's real name is; 009 answers and asks the same to 0013, but unfortunately, 0013 dies before he can answer. Dr. Gilmore viewed him as a prospect of joining the team; in fact, he appears in the first season ending credits of the series dressed in the cyborgs' red uniform.
Cyborg -004 - A mini story arc in the 2001 anime, this cyborg is a duplicate of 004 and can predict all of 004's moves. This assassin is equipped with enhanced versions of 004's weapons, making it a serious threat. -004 was defeated when it launched a missile that nearly struck a bird's nest. -004's computer lead it to believe that 004 would simply dodge the missile in order to survive, but instead 004 jumps to save the bird's nest, throwing off -004's computer, leaving him open to attack. The final battle ensued in a courtyard of the castle they've currently been fighting in; 004 gets the best of -004 and backs him up against a tree whilst a huge lightning bolt strikes the tree with -004 touching it, ultimately causing -004 to blow up.

Humans
 - 001's father, an ex-brain surgeon who went mad after not being able to nurse his seriously ill child back to health, and gave him up to Black Ghost. When the Psychic Assassins came, he was retired, old, and very, very wrinkled; he pretended to sympathize with their plea, but erases their memories and makes them Black Ghost's puppets, determined to get 001 back and settle his old scores with his former rival, Isaac Gilmore. He's ultimately killed by Phil, who uses his powers to give him a heart attack; still, he manages to make peace with Ivan just before dying. He was renamed Dr. Gamo Asimov in the Sony Pictures English dub.
Dr. Gaia - He is the man who created the Greek God Cyborgs and a former Black Ghost scientist. In the manga, he works with Dr. Uranus, another black Ghost scientist, and is far more interested in destroying the rebels and Gilmore. While Uranus tries to peacefully sort things out with Gilmore, hoping that he will simply give up his cyborgs or, later on, make peace with the Greek god cyborgs, Dr. Gaia planned to use sneaky maneuvers and tactics to attack Gilmore and the 00-team when they weren't expecting it. In the anime, he's about the same, minus his rivalry with Uranus and seems to have a grudge against Gilmore, as they thought differently and contested over whether a cyborg's memory should be wiped of the human memories or not. Later on, he killed Artemis for helping 009 and is killed by Apollo when he finds out, shortly after going mad with the power of his overloading machine.

Cyborg Men
A group of mass-produced cyborg men who help try to spark a war in 008's home country. They wear black suits, which also cover their face with red goggles and an air tube which they appear to need for survival. They usually ride in black tanks. Their leader is Number 1, who is 008's old friend, Mamado. He rides a black saucer with laser shooting tentacles which can detach as robotic snakes. He appears to have lost his good heart after the brainwashing he was put through, so he is defeated by a very reluctant 008 after he fails to convince him.

Mythos Cyborgs
Cyborgs who claim to be the gods who have come to Earth to destroy it, so they may end war and rebuild the world. They are unaware of them being cyborgs due to their brainwashing. Most of them dress in white Greek clothes with capes and live on a far away island just off the coast of Greece. They were created by Dr. Gaia who erased their memories and led them to believe they were gods so they would cause destruction and confusion instead of peace.

 - The leading figure in this group, he is very arrogant and destructive. He is the younger brother to Artemis and prefers destruction, but is often swayed to a different course of action by his more compassionate sister, whom he dearly loves. He has flaming red hair, his body glows in battle and he rides in a chariot led by two Pegasi. He has the power to create powerful fire attacks, has the power of acceleration, can throw piercing sun-shaped discs from his belt that create blinding light and cause earthquakes and can fire lasers from his fingers. He is killed in the destruction of the island, after he shoots Gaia to death for killing Artemis. He is the god of the sun.
 - A powerful fighter who serves as Apollo's left hand man and is completely devoted to him. He has a bull's head, blue eyes, a strange mark on his forehead and horns that can fire powerful lightning bolts. He is killed in the destruction of the island.
 - Another powerful fighter who serves as Apollo's right-hand man. He is a humanoid panther with yellow eyes who carries a long sword and a shield capable of firing powerful energy blasts. He also has an acceleration mode which is activated by the balancers on his shoes. He is defeated by 009 with some help from Pan.
 - A powerful sea being who will destroy anyone in his underwater domain. He is always seen in water and resembles a massive merman with a white beard and fins behind his ears. He appears to be able to stay underwater indefinitely and even control it. He is killed in the destruction of the island. He is the god of the sea.
 - The queen of all gods, she distrusts Artemis's change of heart and views it as a weakness. She has long golden hair in an enormous bun, wears a black tiara, has purple skin, and her eyes glow when she uses her powers. She is a psychic like 001. She is killed in the early stages of the destruction, after a psychic duel with 001. Technically, she is the goddess of women, though it isn't shown in the anime or the manga.
 - Apollo's beautiful older sister, she appears to have doubts about killing off the world, although she will do what her duty requires. She is often the voice of reason and dislikes unnecessary violence. Her two companions are Atlas and Pan. She has long, dark blue flowing hair of which a single large lock always covers one of her eyes, with a gold band around her head. She carries a bow which can create powerful energy arrows. She is mortally wounded by Dr. Gaia for helping 009 and being so compassionate, but lives long enough to stop Apollo from killing 009 and dies in his arms after warning him about Gaia's treachery. She is the goddess of the hunt.
 - A constant companion of Artemis, he is a large, green robot with red eyes who towers over all and possesses amazing strength. He is always fighting with Pan over the affection of Artemis. Aside from his strength, he can fire missiles from his chest, shoulders and abdomen. After his mistress's death, he is killed in the destruction of the island.
 - A small childlike being who is another constant companion of Artemis, for whom he shares great affection. He can not speak but often whimpers and moans. He later grows an affection for 003 when she bandages him up, even helping save her from Achilles. He looks like a young satyr with orange hair and a single horn on his head. He has no special abilities. He is killed in the destruction of the island. Technically, he is the god of goats, though it isn't shown in the anime or the manga.
 - A strange, anthropomorphic hippo god in a red ruff and tutu who is unable to speak and appears to serve no purpose. He usually runs away and seems to contribute nothing to the team. It is wondered why he was built. He has no abilities or power. He is killed in the destruction of the island although his death occurred off screen.

The Mutant Warriors

In the 2001 anime, there's an alternate universe where Black Ghost has won the war against the cyborgs, and the world is in perpetual war. Humans have developed psychic powers of a different variety for self-defense, and even then they live in constant fear.

A young man named Nichol, his girlfriend Rina, Rina's younger brother Phil and their friends Cain and Mii learn that  there was peace, and decide to time-travel to search for help. But during their time-jump, they lose sight of Nicholas and arrive, with their life energy completely drained, to the doorstep of Gamo Whisky, Ivan/001's estranged father. Hiding his connections with Black Ghost, he erases the kids' memories and pits them against the cyborgs to retrieve his child, prove his theories about psychic powers right, and defeat his old rival Gilmore's team. After the Warriors turn against a non-brainwashed Nichol and one of them kills him, they fight the cyborgs.

Slowly after each regains their memory, they join the Cyborgs after they rescue 009 and Rina from the future, to fight against Gamo and a treacherous Cain. Gamo is fatally wounded and 001 forgives his father before he dies, since he remembers that Gamo's madness started after he failed to cure Ivan's old birth disease. They each have telepathic abilities, telekinesis, psychic barriers and can teleport at will.

Nichol (Nicholas in English dub) - Was the only psychic to escape Gamo's brainwashing; during the time-jump the others lost sight of him, so he escaped the treatment. He was Rina's boyfriend. He arrives wounded, to warn the Cyborgs, but is killed by the Psychic Assassins; using their telekinetic powers, one of them lifts him up in the air and snaps his neck in front of the horrified Gilmore, 003, 006, 007 and 009. He has black hair and wears normal clothes, and though he's not seen in action he is assumed to have the same powers as the other Assassins without the de-aging process.
Rina (Lena in English dub) - She is truly kind at heart and is the first to regain her memory, but then she is sent back with 009 to the future. Her boyfriend is Nichol, and Phil is her younger brother. She has long thick white hair which she lets flow out. She is the first to regain her memory, which is latent in her subconscious mind for a long time, and the recovery is triggered by seeing Nichol's pendant in Joe's hands. This causes her mind to be in sync with 009 which causes her to time-jump with him and fully reject the brainwashing. She disappears in time with Cain during their duel.
Cain - The only Psychic Assassin who appears to be evil before Gamo's brainwashing, he loves to fight because he enjoys the thrill of possible death, and says that the Cyborgs do not have to worry about him due to his human body. He has the ability to use his psychic powers to speed himself up to keep up with 009's acceleration mode. He has black hair with red tips and a monocle that covers one of his eyes. He is the only one not to in the end join the Cyborgs, and then he tries to destroy the other Assassins. He disappears in time with Rina during their duel, and following his own words he also was the one who killed Nichol.
Mii (Mai in English dub) - She along with Phil later regains her memory and joins the Cyborgs to go to the future and find Rina and 009. She has purple hair with a very thick fringe. She has the ability Synchro-Warp which allows her to send a group through time as long as their minds are in sync. She is the last Assassin left in the end and she simply fades away since her background has changed. She and Rina also have Telepathic Mimicry in which they can falsely communicate telepathically with another person's voice.
Phil - He along with Mii later regains her memory and joins the Cyborgs to go to the future and find Rina and 009. He is Rina's little brother and the youngest of the group, because of this he hates being treated as weak and always tries to show his strength. He has green hair and wears a yellowish suit. Being the youngest he also appears to be the most vulnerable to the ageing process that affects the Assassins due to the time-jump. He dies after using his powers to fatally injure Gamo, calling out to his sister.

The Yomi Kingdom

Deep buried in the Earth's grounds, the Yomi kingdom and its inhabitants, the Pu'Awak, have been enslaved by the dinosaur race known as the Zattan, who treat them as slaves and use their natural fertility to keep them as living food supplies. Black Ghost, or more specifically Skull and his underling Van Vogt (renamed Claus Van Bogoot in the Sony Pictures English dub), suddenly appear to trick the Pu'Awaks into following them to fight for freedom, and they choose 5 Pu'Awak noble-born sisters as their subordinates. The girls (Biina, Helen, Daphne, Aphro and Dinah) are soon disenchanted, and decide to join the Cyborgs instead to reach for true freedom.

Helen - The first to be seen of the Pu'Awak sisters and the eldest one (but youngest in Sony Pictures' English dub), her tiara had red jewels and she also wears a short blue dress. She had her memories partially erased by Black Ghost and was sent towards the Cyborgs as an unwilling spy, with Biina monitoring her through their psychic link. Sweet-tempered and frail due to her lack of memories, she doesn't recover until almost the end of the arc, after a brief brainwashing courtesy of the Zattan; overcoming her own fears and shock, Helen guides 009, 001, 002, 003 and 005 to the Yomi Kingdom, saving Biina and 004 from being executed, but later she and her sister die at the hands of Van Vogt and the kingdom collapses in the upcoming fight. 004 treated her harshly in the first episodes since 008 was seriously injured by the dinosaurs released by Black Ghost and Helen's loyalties still weren't fully revealed. She grew rather fond of 009; 003 was distraught for this, but tried to not hold it up against Helen herself, and was the one who mourned her the most after she died.
Biina (Venus in Tokyopop version, Vena in Sony Pictures' English dub) - The second-eldest of the sisters (changed to eldest in the Sony Pictures English dub), she has a tiara with blue jewels and wears a modern outfit with blue pants and shirt, and the leader of the quintet. Through the other girls' eyes, she can see everything that they see serving as a psychic link to relay information to Van Vogt. When Helen is caught in the crossfire and Van Vogt refuses to rescue her, Biina defects and guides the Cyborg team to Yomi. At first, she and 004 dislike each other intensely, but as the story progresses, they learn to understand each other, despite Biina's increasing pessimism about the whole matter. She's later shot to death along with her sisters by Van Vogt and dies in Albert's arms, just like Hilda.
Dinah (Diana in Tokyopop version) - Third Pu'Awak sister, her tiara has pink jewels. Very quiet and gentle, she manages to make Daphne explain why she betrayed their plan. She also dies after being shot by Van Vogt. Some moments of the English dub refer to her as Deena, due to difficulty with pronouncing her name.
Aphro - The fourth sister, she wears a white gown and a tiara with green jewels. She rarely speaks, but is very assertive and opinionated. She discovers Daphne's treachery and harshly lectures her, but ends up forgiving her due to Dinah's pleas. She also dies after being shot by Van Vogt.
Daphne - Fifth and youngest Pu'Awak sister, she has a tiara with purple beads and is the most insecure of the group. She's so distraught about the high failure possibility of her sisters' plans that she betrays them to Van Vogt, leaking info about their alliance with the Cyborgs. After Dinah and Aphro unmask her, she has a change of heart and joins them fully, freeing Gilmore and some of the cyborgs when they're captured by Black Ghost, only to be killed by Van Vogt along with her sisters.

Others

Cynthia Findor (Cynthia Findoru in English dub). Daughter of a scientist who was forced to work for Black Ghost.
Princess Ixquic. A lonely and ancient android shaped as a beautiful songstress, who guards a golden pyramid in the Andes along with a blood-thirsty robot named Cabrakan. She's not evil, though; actually, Ixquic longs for company but isn't allowed to meet other people, since the pyramid must be hidden from the world. She and the pyramid can only be seen when the wind blows through a rock portal in the mountain, yet every time Ixquic is given the chance to interact with humans, they try to steal the treasures sealed in the place, so Cabrakan attacks them and kills them before Ixquic can do anything to stop him and convince her "visitors" to leave the riches alone. One of Cabrakan's victims happened to be an old friend of 007, so the Cyborgs go to the Andes to investigate; 009 is separated from the others and meets up with Ixquic, whom he expresses sympathy for, while the others find the corpses of the scientists and believe Ixquic to be evil. Cabrakan attacks them and the issue is cleared, but in the brawl the rock portal is destroyed and Ixquic, the pyramid and Cabrakan's remains disappear from the world.
Sphynx. A super computer which is the heart and mind of the cyber city Computopia, built by a friend of Gilmore named Dr. Eckermann. Unbeknownst to Eckermann, the computer has a mind of its own modeled after the scientist's late son, Carl, a brilliant yet emotionally stunted engineer who died in an accident before Computopia was finished.

Confused, angry and depressed, Carl took over the Sphynx and attacked the Cyborgs, especially 004 who had expressed his doubts about Computopia; he also fell in love with 003, who greatly reminded of his dead mother, and kidnapped her to try brainwashing her into staying with him forever. When 009 went to rescue his kidnapped friend, Carl sent a robot doppelganger of 003 to kill Joe by self-detonation. Instead, she chose to blow herself up rather than hurting him, and 002 had to show the deceit to a distraught 009.

With Dr. Eckermann's help, 009 hooked himself up to the same device 003's body was connected to and reached for her mind, set in a virtual fantasy world; they tried to help Carl and set him free from the Sphynx, but he was so distraught that he shut himself off completely and destroyed the Sphynx.

Jimmy. A young boy and from New York that befriends Jet when he returns home and lives in the Bronx.
Cathy. Who runs the Sweet Pot coffee shop and is the single mother of Jimmy. She greatly dislikes Jet, telling her to leave Jimmy alone and stop telling him 'ridiculous' stories. Later, she doesn't mind so much after Jet saves her from a fire.

References

Cyborg 009
Cyborg 009